Trinucleotide repeat-containing gene 6A protein is a protein that in humans is encoded by the TNRC6A gene.

This gene encodes a member of the trinucleotide repeat containing 6 protein family. The protein functions in post-transcriptional gene silencing through the RNA interference (RNAi) and microRNA pathways. The protein associates with messenger RNAs and Argonaute proteins in cytoplasmic bodies known as GW-bodies or P-bodies. Inhibiting expression of this gene delocalizes other GW-body proteins and impairs RNAi and microRNA-induced gene silencing.

References

Further reading